Swedish singer Zara Larsson has released three studio albums, four extended plays, 28 singles (including six as a featured artist) and 24 music videos. Five of Larsson's singles, "Uncover", "Lush Life", "Never Forget You" , "Ain't My Fault" and "Symphony" have topped the charts in her native country, Sweden. "Uncover" and "Lush Life" peaked in the top five in Norway, Sweden, the Netherlands, Belgium and Denmark, and in the top 10 in France.

In October 2014, Larsson released her debut studio album, 1, which topped the Swedish Albums Chart and was certified platinum in her home country, while reaching number 28 in Norway and number 33 in Denmark.

Larsson's second album, So Good, was released worldwide on 17 March 2017. It was her first album released internationally and topped the Swedish Albums Chart and reached the top 10 in several countries, including Australia, New Zealand, Norway, Denmark and the United Kingdom.

Studio albums

Extended plays

Singles

As lead artist

As featured artist

Promotional singles

Other charted songs

Other appearances

Music videos

Notes

References

External links
 
 
 
 

Discographies of Swedish artists
Pop music discographies
Discography